Anne Brown (1912–2009) was an American soprano.

Anne or Ann Brown may also refer to:

Anne Brown (educator) (1854–1940), American teacher and principal
Ann Brown (1943–1999), British educational psychologist
Ann Brown (curler) (died 2006), American curler
Ann Brown, chair of the U.S. Consumer Product Safety Commission from 1994 to 2001
Anne Brown (game designer), American designer and editor of role-playing games
Anne S. K. Brown (1906–1985), American military historian
Ann Dudin Brown (1822–1917), English benefactor
Anne Gust Brown (born 1958), American business executive and wife of the Governor of California Jerry Brown

See also  
Anna Brown (disambiguation)
Ann Browne (born 1955), Trinidadian international cricketer
Anne Browne (c. 1495–1582), Tudor noblewoman
Anne Browne (died 1511), wife of Charles Brandon, 1st Duke of Suffolk